Les Vies des Saints de Bretagne is a book by Guy Alexis Lobineau, O.S.B. It was published in Rennes in 1725.

It describes several saints of Brittany, and their feast days. These include the following individuals, listed by feast day:

June
21 - Aaron of Aleth
22 - Aaron of Aleth

References
Holweck, F. G. A Biographical Dictionary of the Saint. St. Louis, MO: B. Herder Book Co. 1924.

Christian hagiography
French books
1838 books